The Middletown Road station is a local station of the IRT Pelham Line of the New York City Subway. Located at Middletown Road and Westchester Avenue in the Bronx, it is served by the 6 train at all times except weekdays in the peak direction, when the <6> train takes over.

History 
This station opened on December 20, 1920 as part of the final extension of the Pelham Line from Westchester Square to Pelham Bay Park. Service to Pelham Bay Park was originally provided by a mix of through and shuttle trains during the 1920s.

From October 5, 2013 to May 4, 2014, the station was closed for rehabilitation work. The Metropolitan Transportation Authority (MTA) was sued for violating the Americans with Disabilities Act by not including elevators in the renovation. The MTA lost the lawsuit, being obligated to add ADA improvements to all major renovations in the future.

Station layout

This elevated station has two side platforms and three tracks. The center express track is not used in regular service. South of the station are track leads to Westchester Yard, the main yard for all 6 and <6> trains. The center and Manhattan-bound local tracks rise above these leads.

Both platforms have beige windscreens and red canopies with green frames and support columns in the center. On either ends are white waist-high steel fences with sodium lampposts at regular intervals. The station name signs are in the standard black plates with white Helvetica lettering.

Exits
This station has one wooden elevated mezzanine below the platforms and tracks. Two staircases from the center of each platform go down to the mezzanine, where a turnstile bank provides access to and from the station. Outside fare control, there is a token booth and two street stairs. One goes south down to the triangular corner of Middletown Road and Westchester Avenue and the other to the north side of Westchester Avenue.

References

External links 

 
 Station Reporter — 6 Train
 The Subway Nut — Middletown Road Pictures
 Middletown Road entrance from Google Maps Street View
 Platforms from Google Maps Street View

IRT Pelham Line stations
New York City Subway stations in the Bronx
Railway stations in the United States opened in 1920
1920 establishments in New York City